Povrakulskaya is a rural locality (a village) in Talazhskoye Rural Settlement of Primorsky District, Arkhangelsk Oblast, Russia. The population was 559 as of 2010. There are 8 streets.

Geography 
Povrakulskaya is located on the Povrakulsky Island, 14 km north of Arkhangelsk (the district's administrative centre) by road. Talagi is the nearest rural locality.

References 

Rural localities in Primorsky District, Arkhangelsk Oblast